No Pressure is the debut solo studio album by American rapper and record producer Erick Sermon. It was released on October 19, 1993, via Rush Associated Labels. Production was mainly handled by Sermon, who also served as executive producer. The album features guest appearances from Ice Cube, Joe Sinistr, Kam, Keith Murray, Redman and Shadz of Lingo. The album made it to #16 on the Billboard 200 chart and #2 on the Top R&B/Hip-Hop Albums chart in the United States.

The album spawned two singles: "Hittin' Switches" and "Stay Real".

Track listing

Personnel
Erick Sermon – main artist, producer (tracks: 2–8, 10–16), co-producer (track 17), executive producer
Joe Sinistr – featured artist (track 2)
Jeffrey Stewart – featured artist & arranger (track 5)
Keith Omar Murray – featured artist (tracks: 5, 14)
Shadz Of Lingo – featured artist (track 12)
Craig A. Miller – featured artist (track 13)
O'Shea Jackson Sr. – featured artist (track 13)
Reginald Noble – featured artist (track 14)
Debra Killings – vocals (track 7)
Derrick Culbreath – vocals (track 11)
Michael J. Morgan "Soup" – vocals (track 16)
Brent Tucker – producer (track 17)
Colin Wolfe – co-producer (track 16)
Robert David Greenberg – engineering (tracks: 2, 5, 14, 15)
George "Catfish" Pappas – engineering (tracks: 3, 4, 6, 16), mixing (tracks: 7, 10)
Darin Prindle – engineering (tracks: 7, 8, 10–12, 17)
Tony Dawsey – mastering
Danny Clinch – photography

Charts

References

External links
No Pressure on Bandcamp

1993 debut albums
Erick Sermon albums
Def Jam Recordings albums
Albums produced by Erick Sermon